The 1951 Ohio State Buckeyes football team represented the Ohio State University in the 1951 Big Ten Conference football season. The Buckeyes compiled a 4–3–2 record in their first season with Woody Hayes as head coach. The Buckeyes outscored their opponents, 109–104, but fell to Michigan, 7–0, in the season finale.

Schedule

Coaching staff
 Woody Hayes, head coach, first year

Game summaries

SMU

The only score in Woody Hayes' debut as Ohio State's head coach came in the second quarter on a 21-yard scoring pass.

Michigan State

Wisconsin

Indiana

Iowa

Tony Curcillo threw four touchdown passes and ran for two more to give Woody Hayes his first conference victory. Curcillo finished 10 of 14 for 292 yards.

Northwestern

Pittsburgh

Illinois

Michigan

1952 NFL draftees

References

Ohio State
Ohio State Buckeyes football seasons
Ohio State Buckeyes football